Uncial 0303 (in the Gregory-Aland numbering), is a Greek uncial manuscript of the New Testament.  Paleographically it has been assigned to the 7th century.

Description 

The codex contains the text of the Gospel of Luke 13:17- 29, on 1 parchment leaf (26.2 cm by 19.5 cm). It is written in two columns per page, 23 lines per page, in uncial letters. Formerly it was classified as lectionary 355 (ℓ 355).

It was examined by Henri Omont.

Currently it is dated by the INTF to the 7th century.

It is currently housed at the Bibliothèque nationale de France (Supplément grec 1155 VII, fol. 19) in Paris.

See also 

 List of New Testament uncials
 Biblical manuscripts
 Textual criticism

References

Further reading 
 Henri Omont, Catalogue des manuscrits grecs, p. 1-2

Greek New Testament uncials
7th-century biblical manuscripts